The 2001 Greyhound bus attack occurred on October 3, 2001, near Manchester, Tennessee, when Damir Igrić (September 21, 1972 – October 3, 2001), a Croatian, commandeered a Greyhound Lines bus en route from Chicago to Orlando, Florida. He slashed the throat of the driver with a utility knife, causing the bus to crash into oncoming traffic. Seven people, including Igrić, died as a result of the crash.

Details of the attack
The Federal Bureau of Investigation established that Igrić had boarded the Greyhound bus in Chicago. The bus was carrying 39 passengers at the time, and was travelling from Chicago to its final destination of Orlando, Florida. He proceeded to grab the steering wheel in an attempt to direct the vehicle into oncoming traffic.

The driver, Garfield Sands, from Marietta, Georgia, drove the route from Indianapolis to Atlanta. Igrić approached Sands at least three times, and asked how much time remained until the next stop. Sands advised Igrić that they would be making a stop in Manchester, and that he should go back to his seat. When Igrić approached Sands for the final time, he did not say anything, but produced a sharp object and attempted to slash Sands' throat. Igrić then grabbed the steering wheel, causing the bus to crash. Sands managed to survive both the attempted murder and the ensuing crash. His doctor was later able to describe his version of the attack:

 He said that this fellow a couple of times, even after he made the announcement of when the next layover was, came up and asked him about routing and times, then the last time he came up again and this time without saying anything he just attacked him and cut his neck. Then he pushed the driver out of the way and took the wheel himself and drove it off the road.

A passenger named Carly Rinearson was sitting in the seat directly behind the driver and encountered Igrić numerous times in the hours before the attack.

This guy approached me and asked me what time it was and then asked for my seat. When I refused he then went back to his seat at the back of the bus. Then an hour later he came up with a small knife or pocketknife and just reached around and slit the driver's throat.

The bus rolled over with the driver's side on top; Igrić toppled through the windshield and died on impact. Six other people also died in the crash. The driver was able to crawl out the window and run about  up the highway to get help. The 39 passengers of the bus were all sleeping at the time and were all injured in various ways.
Twenty-one passengers were treated at hospitals and released. Nine were hospitalized in stable condition, and three were in critical condition.

Greyhound response
Media attention to this event was intense, with suggestions of terrorist activity. The United States was on edge since only weeks before, the September 11 attacks had happened.
A temporary nationwide shutdown of the Greyhound bus service was put into effect.

No extra security measures were immediately taken in response to this incident. However, following a very similar incident almost a year later, Greyhound Lines installed partitions on most of its newer coaches that, even if forced open, would prevent someone from easily reaching the driver directly.

Attacker

Igrić was born in 1972 in Slavonski Brod, Yugoslavia (now Croatia). During his late teenage years he trained as a locksmith in vocational school. He joined the Croatian army in 1991, when he was 19, and was discharged in 1993, after what the ambassador of Croatia, Ivan Grdešić, described as "violent behavior and substance abuse... he was connected with crimes in Croatia." When ethnic tensions began to flare during the mid-nineties he joined others in Croatia's "homeland war" of independence from Yugoslavia.

Igrić, a citizen of Croatia, entered the United States through the city of Miami, Florida during March 1999, on a 30-day transit visa. He overstayed the visa by two years, convincing US immigration officials he had relatives in Florida and New York. He worked in a restaurant in New York City before the Greyhound incident. Igrić had a long history of mental illness.

See also
List of rampage killers in the United States
Killing of Tim McLean, another knife attack on a Greyhound bus

References

Mass murder in 2001
Coffee County, Tennessee
Intercity bus incidents
2001 murders in the United States
2001 in Tennessee
Attacks in the United States in 2001
Mass murder in the United States
Bus incidents in the United States